WRVV (97.3 FM, "The River 97.3") is a commercial FM radio station licensed to serve Harrisburg, Pennsylvania. The station is owned by iHeartMedia, Inc. and broadcasts a classic rock format. The station's studios and offices are located at 600 Corporate Circle in Harrisburg. 

WRVV has an effective radiated power (ERP) of 15,000 watts. It uses the slogan is "Real. Rock. Variety." WRVV broadcasts using HD Radio technology. Its HD2 digital subchannel simulcasts the talk radio programming on sister station WHP 580 AM.

History

WHP-FM
On January 10, 1945, WHP, Inc. applied to the Federal Communications Commission for a construction permit for a new station on 43.5 MHz on the original 42-50 MHz FM broadcast band.  After the FCC created the current FM band on June 27, 1945, the Commission granted the permit on November 21, 1945, while modifying it by reassigning the station to 97.3 MHz on the new FM band. The FCC then granted permission to begin broadcasting at any time beginning on March 18, 1946.

WHP, Inc operated the station under special temporary authority (STA) for several years, during which time numerous changes were made to the station's broadcast facilities. In June 1946, the station first signed on with the WHP-FM call sign.  Its power was only 4,300 watts.  A TV station, WHP-TV, was added in 1953. WHP-AM-FM originally simulcast their programming.  In the 1950s, it duplicated WHP about 50% of the broadcast day, with the remainder devoted to instrumentals and some classical music programming.  In the 1960s, the station's format evolved to beautiful music, which would continue for nearly three decades. In the late 1980s, however, the soft instrumental format was aging and management decided a change was needed. By March 1988, WHP-FM had tweaked the format to "music-intensive adult contemporary".

WXBB
In February 1990, the station switched its call letters to WXBB, and flipped to Top 40/CHR as B97.3. The Top 40 format was short-lived, and the station returned to easy listening as WHP-FM in December 1990.

In March 1992, WHP-AM-FM were sold to Pennsylvania Broadcasting Associates, a division of Dame Media, which separated the stations from WHP-TV. Studios were moved out of the WHP-TV building to their current location at 600 Corporate Circle in Harrisburg. The FM station went through numerous changes following the sale.

WRVV
The call sign was changed to WRVV in March 1992. The station's branding was switched to The River 97.3.  It was the first station in the country to be branded as The River.  WRVV's slogan was changed to "Rock and Roll without the Hard Edge." The station changed format to "Rock Adult Contemporary." 

The format played tracks from popular rock albums released over the previous 15 years intended for a general rock listener not interested in current titles. The station's Operations Manager at the time, Chris Tyler, created the format.

iHeartMedia ownership
In August 1998, the Dame Media stations, including WHP and WRVV, were sold to Clear Channel Communications, the forerunner to iHeartMedia, Inc. The format changed to classic rock after the sale. In the mid-2000s, the station changed its slogan to "Real. Rock. Variety."

In 2004, WRVV and Cumulus Media's WNNK-FM were the first stations in Harrisburg to begin using HD Radio. Since the mid-1990s, WRVV and WNNK frequently trade the number one spot in Nielsen Audio's Harrisburg-Lebanon-Carlisle radio market.

References

External links
WRVV Official Website

RVV
Radio stations established in 1946
Classic rock radio stations in the United States
1946 establishments in Pennsylvania
IHeartMedia radio stations